Ancula is  a genus of sea slugs, specifically dorid nudibranchs, marine gastropod molluscs in the family Goniodorididae.

Species
Species within the genus Ancula include:
 Ancula espinosai Ortea, 2001
 Ancula evelinae Er. Marcus, 1961
 Ancula fuegiensis Odhner, 1926
 Ancula gibbosa (Risso, 1818) - originally described as Tritonia gibbosa Risso, 1818 
 Ancula kariyana Baba, 1990
 Ancula lentiginosa Farmer & Sloan, 1964
 Ancula mapae (Burn, 1961)
 Ancula sp. Giraffe spot nudibranch

Species names which are currently considered to be synonyms:
 Ancula cristata (Alder, 1841) accepted as Ancula gibbosa (Risso, 1818)
 Ancula pacifica MacFarland, 1964 accepted as Ancula gibbosa (Risso, 1818)
 Ancula sulphurea Stimpson, 1853 accepted as Ancula gibbosa (Risso, 1818)

References

 Gofas, S.; Le Renard, J.; Bouchet, P. (2001). Mollusca. in: Costello, M.J. et al. (eds), European Register of Marine Species: a check-list of the marine species in Europe and a bibliography of guides to their identification. Patrimoines Naturels. 50: 180-213.

External links

Goniodorididae